Mossimo is a sportswear and accessories American company, founded in 1986 by designer Mossimo Giannulli and owned by Iconix Brand Group since 2006. Mossimo specializes in youth and teenage clothing such as shirts, jeans, jackets, socks, underwear, and accessories.

History

Founding (1986) and expansion
Mossimo was founded in 1986 by Mossimo Giannulli on Balboa Island in Newport Beach, California. Giannulli dropped out of the University of Southern California in 1987, to create his Mossimo streetwear line, with a $100,000 loan from his father. At the close of his company's first fiscal year, Giannulli had $1 million in profits. The following year, he had $4 million.

Mossimo clothing features prominently in the 1990 volleyball film Side Out.

IPO (1996) and relationship with Target (2000–2017)
In 1996, Mossimo went public in an initial public offering. After shares tumbled from $50.00 to $4.75 when Giannulli tried and failed to transition the brand from streetwear/beachwear to high fashion, he took the brand downscale. On March 28, 2000, Mossimo, Inc announced a major, multi-product licensing agreement with Target stores, for $27.8 million. In 2017, Target underwent a makeover, introducing new smaller lines and eliminating bigger billion-dollar lines, including Mossimo.

Target distanced itself from Mossimo amid Mossimo Giannulli's involvement in the 2019 college admissions bribery scandal, saying that Target had not been involved with Giannulli in over a decade. Mossimo and his wife, actress Lori Loughlin, have been convicted of bribing University of Southern California officials with up to $500,000, to secure enrollment of their two daughters.

Acquisition by Iconix (2006)
In 2006, Mossimo was acquired by Iconix Brand Group.

Gallery

References

External links
 
 

Sportswear brands
1986 establishments in California
2006 mergers and acquisitions
American companies established in 1986
Clothing brands of the United States
Clothing companies established in 1986
Companies based in Newport Beach, California
Iconix Brand Group
Jeans by brand
Manufacturing companies based in Greater Los Angeles
Target Corporation